Midnight Moon is a concert video by Train released on February 11, 2002. On May 26, 2001, the band returned to the band's hometown to play a sold-out gig at San Francisco's historic Warfield Theatre. They played in total, sixteen songs, mostly from their second album, Drops of Jupiter. Extras on the DVD include documentary footage, interviews with each of the band's members, a discography showcasing their first two albums, and a photo gallery.

Track listing
 "Respect"
 "It's About You"
 "Meet Virginia"
 "Mississippi"
 "Ramble On" (Led Zeppelin cover)
 "I Wish You Would"
 "She's on Fire"
 "I Am"
 "Hopeless"
 "Getaway"
 "Drops of Jupiter (Tell Me)"
 "Heavy"
 "Eggplant"
 "Free"
 "Something More"
 "Let It Roll"

2002 video albums
Train (band) albums